Arkansas Highway 400 (AR 400), also known as Shepherd Springs Road, is a short state highway in Crawford County.

Route description
Highway 400 begins at US 71 northeast of Chester.  The route passes through the rugged terrain of the Ozark National Forest.  The highway descends down a steep hill, this section of road features a hairpin turn.  It continues to descend the hill until it reaches the entrance to Lake Fort Smith State Park, where the designation ends.

Major intersections

References

External links

400
Transportation in Crawford County, Arkansas